Saul Metzstein (born 30 December 1970) is a Scottish film director. He won the British Academy Scotland New Talent Award for best director in 2002 for Late Night Shopping.

Metzstein is the son of Isi Metzstein, the renowned modernist architect, and Danielle Kahn. He was raised in Glasgow and studied architecture at Robinson College, Cambridge before taking minor production roles on Danny Boyle's Shallow Grave and Trainspotting and Gillies MacKinnon's Small Faces. He came to prominence with the 2001 feature Late Night Shopping. He subsequently directed documentaries on James Stewart and Gillespie, Kidd & Coia and an episode of Upstairs Downstairs, as well as five episodes of the seventh series of Doctor Who.

Selected films/TV

External links and references 

Scottish film directors
1970 births
Alumni of Robinson College, Cambridge
Living people
People educated at Hillhead High School
Scottish Jews
British Jews